WWT Llanelli Wetland Centre at Llanelli, Carmarthenshire, Wales is one of ten wetland nature reserves in the UK managed by the Wildfowl and Wetlands Trust, a nature conservation charity. The visitor centre has accessible toilets, a coffee shop and retail area. During school holidays, there are nature-based activities and events.

Location

It is part of the Burry Inlet estuary which is an SSSI (Site of Special Scientific Interest), an SPA (Special Protection Area), and a  Ramsar site.

With many ecologically important wetland habitats, the site is a vital refuge for some of the world's most endangered migratory birds, many of which are rare or endangered.

In autumn and winter, more than 60,000 birds return here to overwinter.  Threatened species protected at the centre include little egret, lapwing, water vole, black-tailed godwit and many more.

References

External links

  WWT Llanelli Wetland Centre website

Tourist attractions in Carmarthenshire
Wetlands of Carmarthenshire
Nature centres in Wales
National Wetlands Centre
National Wetlands Centre
Llanelli
Llanelli